Estes Brook is an unincorporated community in Mille Lacs County, Minnesota, United States.  The community is located near the junction of Mille Lacs County Road 7 and 70th Street.  County Roads 12 and 13 are also in the immediate area.

Estes Brook is located within Greenbush Township and Milo Township.  Nearby places include Milaca, Foreston, Oak Park, and Princeton.

References

Unincorporated communities in Mille Lacs County, Minnesota
Unincorporated communities in Minnesota